Eupogonius wickhami is a species of beetle in the family Cerambycidae. It was described by Fisher in 1935. It is known from the Bahamas and Jamaica.

References

Eupogonius
Beetles described in 1935